Zadara is a cloud computing company founded in 2011, with headquarters in Irvine, California.  The company develops computer software that it markets as storage-as-a-service, which can be used for cloud or on-premises servers, a model sometimes called private cloud.

History
Zadara Storage was founded in 2011 with $3 million in start-up funding. In 2012, the company introduced cloud-based storage to Amazon.com's public cloud customers.  The storage was designed to be used as persistent storage in conjunction with Amazon's Elastic Compute Cloud (EC2). The company started by selling block data storage for storage area networks (SAN), and later added network attached storage (NAS) for cloud customers.

In July 2012 the company completed a $7 million first funding round. In August 2013, Toshiba's America Electronic Components (TAEC) division invested $3 million in the company. Reports indicated that as part of the investment, Toshiba's disk drives would be used in Zadara's storage products. In 2014, Zadara was named a Cool Vendor by informational technology advisory firm Gartner.

In September 2018, the company closed a $25 million series C funding round, led by Israel Growth Partners.

In 2019, Asigra, a cloud-based data recovery software based in Toronto, Canada, partnered with Zadara "to release a purpose-built backup appliance with a subscription-based pricing model" that "aimed at service providers who would rather rent than buy."

In February 2021, Zadara acquired developer NeoKarm, the developer of an Amazon Web Services-compatible cloud system. Also in February, the company became the official sponsor of Alfa Romeo in Formula One.

Products and services
Zadara Storage sells enterprise-class data storage services on a pay-as-you-go basis to companies worldwide through its Zadara Enterprise Data Cloud, for which it holds a patent. The operating software combines the company's proprietary software with third-party software including OpenStack, and allows the storage to be distributed to different users or tenants in a multi-tenant environment. The platform allows users to create private clouds consisting of multiple high-availability cluster virtual storage arrays. In addition to its block and file storage services, the company also sells Amazon S3/OpenStack Swift-compliant object storage services.

The Zadara Storage Backup to Amazon S3 (B2S3) product allows automatic backups from Zadara Storage Cloud to Amazon S3-compatible storage.  Zadara Container Services is technology that embeds Docker containers into Zadara's storage arrays.

References

External links 
 

Companies established in 2011
Companies based in Irvine, California
Cloud storage
Software companies based in California
2011 establishments in California
Software companies of the United States
2011 establishments in the United States
Software companies established in 2011